The sixth season of the fantasy drama television series Game of Thrones premiered on HBO on April 24, 2016, and concluded on June 26. It consists of 10 episodes, each of approximately 50–60 minutes long. Much of the season's storyline is derived from content not yet published in George R. R. Martin's A Song of Ice and Fire series, although a significant amount of material from A Feast for Crows, A Dance with Dragons and the upcoming sixth novel The Winds of Winter, which Martin outlined to showrunners David Benioff and D.B. Weiss, was used. The series was adapted for television by Benioff and Weiss. HBO had ordered the season on April 8, 2014, together with the fifth season, which began filming in July 2015 primarily in Northern Ireland, Spain, Croatia, Iceland and Canada. The season cost over $100 million to produce.

The season follows the continuing struggle among the noble families of Westeros for the Iron Throne. The Starks and allies defeat the Bolton forces in the "Battle of the Bastards" reuniting Sansa Stark and Jon Snow, who is proclaimed the King in the North, while Ramsay Bolton is killed. In Essos, Tyrion Lannister rules Meereen while Daenerys Targaryen is held captive by the Dothraki, after which she burns the Khals, emerges from the flames of their temple alive leading the surviving Dothraki to pledge her their loyalty. At King's Landing, Margaery Tyrell capitulates to the High Sparrow, who becomes more powerful by influencing King Tommen. The imprisoned Cersei avoids her trial by destroying the Great Sept with wildfire, killing the Sparrows, her uncle, and the Tyrells. Tommen commits suicide in the wake of the blast, and his mother is crowned Queen of the Seven Kingdoms. Ellaria Sand and Oberyn Martell's daughters kill Doran and Trystane Martell and seize control of Dorne. Arya Stark finishes her assassin training and returns to Westeros to resume her revenge list. Bran Stark becomes the Three-Eyed Raven, escapes the White Walkers, and returns to the Wall. Yara Greyjoy fails in her bid to be queen of the Iron Islands, so she and Theon ally with Daenerys. Varys secures an alliance for her with Olenna and the Dornish.

Game of Thrones features a large ensemble cast, including Peter Dinklage, Nikolaj Coster-Waldau, Lena Headey, Emilia Clarke, and Kit Harington. The season introduced new cast members, including Max von Sydow, Pilou Asbæk, and Essie Davis, and returned Isaac Hempstead Wright and David Bradley to the series. Additionally, Rory McCann returned to the series after his character, Sandor Clegane, was presumably left for dead in the fourth season. The season finale also marked the final appearances of Iwan Rheon, Kristian Nairn, Natalie Dormer, Jonathan Pryce, and Finn Jones.

Critics praised its production values, writing, plot development, and cast. Game of Thrones received the most nominations for the 68th Primetime Emmy Awards, with 23 nominations, and won 12, including that for Outstanding Drama Series for the second year in a row. U.S. viewership rose compared to the previous season, and by approximately 13 percent over its course, from 7.9 million to 8.9 million by the finale.

Synopsis

Background
At this point in Game of Thrones, Margaery has married the new King Tommen Baratheon, Joffrey's younger brother, in King's Landing. The Sparrows, a group of religious fanatics, impose their views upon the city, imprisoning Margaery, her brother Loras, and Cersei for committing various sins. Jaime travels to Dorne to take back Myrcella Baratheon. However, Oberyn Martell's lover, Ellaria, and his bastard daughters kill Myrcella as revenge for Oberyn's death. In Winterfell, the new seat of House Bolton, Baelish arranges Sansa's marriage with the now-legitimized son of Roose Bolton, the sadist Ramsay. Stannis's unsuccessful march on Winterfell, which leads to his death, allows Sansa the opportunity to escape with Theon. At the Wall, as the newly elected Lord Commander of the Night's Watch, Jon Snow forms an alliance with the Wildlings to save them from the White Walkers and their army of reanimated corpses. However, Jon is stabbed to death by some brothers who see him as a traitor. Arya arrives in Braavos, where she finds Jaqen H'ghar whom she had previously helped escape and begins training with the Faceless Men, a guild of assassins. In Essos, Tyrion becomes an advisor to Daenerys. Ser Jorah saves the life of Daenerys against a revolt of slavers, who flees Meereen on Drogon's back.

Episodes

Cast

Main cast

Guest cast
The recurring actors listed here are those who appeared in season 6. They are listed by the region in which they first appear:

In the North, including the Wall
 Daniel Portman as Podrick Payne
 Natalia Tena as Osha
 Art Parkinson as Rickon Stark
 Owen Teale as Alliser Thorne
 Ben Crompton as Eddison Tollett
 Brenock O'Connor as Olly
 Charlotte Hope as Myranda
 Elizabeth Webster as Walda Bolton
 Paul Rattray as Harald Karstark
 Dean Jagger as Smalljon Umber
 Tim McInnerny as Robett Glover
 Bella Ramsey as Lyanna Mormont
 Sean Blowers as Wyman Manderly
 Tom Varey as Cley Cerwyn
 Richard Rycroft as Maester Wolkan
 Michael Condron as Bowen Marsh
 Brian Fortune as Othell Yarwyck
 Ian Whyte as Wun Wun
 Murray McArthur as Dim Dalba

Beyond the Wall
 Max von Sydow as the Three-eyed Raven
 Ellie Kendrick as Meera Reed
 Kristian Nairn as Hodor
 Joseph Mawle as Benjen Stark
 Kae Alexander as Leaf
 Vladimir "Furdo" Furdik as the Night King

In the Riverlands
 David Bradley as Walder Frey
 Clive Russell as Brynden Tully
 Tobias Menzies as Edmure Tully
 Richard Dormer as Beric Dondarrion
 Paul Kaye as Thoros of Myr
 Tim Plester as Black Walder Rivers
 Daniel Tuite as Lothar Frey
 Jóhannes Haukur Jóhannesson as Lem
 Ricky Champ as Gatins
 Ian Davies as Morgan
 Ian McShane as Brother Ray

On the Iron Islands
 Gemma Whelan as Yara Greyjoy
 Patrick Malahide as Balon Greyjoy
 Pilou Asbæk as Euron Greyjoy
 Michael Feast as Aeron Greyjoy

In Dorne
 Alexander Siddig as Doran Martell
 Toby Sebastian as Trystane Martell
 Jessica Henwick as Nymeria Sand
 Keisha Castle-Hughes as Obara Sand
 Rosabell Laurenti Sellers as Tyene Sand
 DeObia Oparei as Areo Hotah

In King's Landing
 Diana Rigg as Olenna Tyrell
 Julian Glover as Grand Maester Pycelle
 Finn Jones as Loras Tyrell
 Anton Lesser as Qyburn
 Roger Ashton-Griffiths as Mace Tyrell
 Eugene Simon as Lancel Lannister
 Ian Gelder as Kevan Lannister
 Hannah Waddingham as Septa Unella
 Nell Tiger Free as Myrcella Baratheon
 Hafþór Júlíus Björnsson as Gregor Clegane
 Josephine Gillan as Marei
 Nathanael Saleh as Arthur
 Annette Hannah as Frances

In the Vale
 Lino Facioli as Robin Arryn
 Rupert Vansittart as Yohn Royce

In Braavos
 Faye Marsay as the Waif
 Richard E. Grant as Izembaro
 Essie Davis as Lady Crane
 Leigh Gill as Bobono
 Eline Powell as Bianca
 Rob Callender as Clarenzo
 Kevin Eldon as Camello

In Meereen
 Jacob Anderson as Grey Worm
 George Georgiou as Razdal mo Eraz
 Eddie Jackson as Belicho Paenymion
 Enzo Cilenti as Yezzan zo Qaggaz
 Ania Bukstein as Kinvara
 Gerald Lepkowski as Zanrush
 Meena Rayann as Vala

In Vaes Dothrak
 Joe Naufahu as Khal Moro
 Andrei Claude as Khal Rhalko
 Tamer Hassan as Khal Forzho
 Staz Nair as Qhono
 Chuku Modu as Aggo
 Deon Lee-Williams as Iggo
 Souad Faress as the High Priestess
 Hannah John-Kamen as Ornella

In the Reach
 James Faulkner as Randyll Tarly
 Samantha Spiro as Melessa Tarly
 Freddie Stroma as Dickon Tarly
 Rebecca Benson as Talla Tarly

In flashbacks
 Robert Aramayo & Sebastian Croft as Eddard Stark
 Matteo Elezi as Benjen Stark
 Aisling Franciosi & Cordelia Hill as Lyanna Stark
 Wayne Foskett as Rickard Stark
 Fergus Leathem as Rodrik Cassel
 Annette Tierney as Old Nan
 Sam Coleman as Hodor
 Leo Woodruff as Howland Reed
 Luke Roberts as Arthur Dayne
 Eddie Eyre as Gerold Hightower
 David Rintoul as Aerys II Targaryen

Production

Crew
The writing staff for the sixth season includes executive producers and showrunners David Benioff and D. B. Weiss, producer Bryan Cogman, and Dave Hill. Author George R. R. Martin, who had written one episode for each of the first four seasons, did not write an episode for the sixth season, as he chose to resume working on the sixth A Song of Ice and Fire novel, The Winds of Winter. The directing staff for the sixth season was Jeremy Podeswa (episodes 1 and 2), Daniel Sackheim (episodes 3 and 4), Jack Bender (episodes 5 and 6), Mark Mylod (episodes 7 and 8), and Miguel Sapochnik (episodes 9 and 10). Sackheim and Bender were first-time Game of Thrones directors, with the rest each having directed two episodes in the previous season.

Writing
With the end of the fifth season, the plot has reached the most recent novel in Martin's A Song of Ice and Fire series, A Dance with Dragons. Season 6 director Jeremy Podeswa said in August 2015, "Right now in season six, what we're shooting currently isn't based on anything in the book. It's fully based on discussions the writers have had with George Martin, because the series has now surpassed the books in terms of what's available." Actress Natalie Dormer, who plays Margaery Tyrell, later added that the show's writers "know where it's got to go and what [George Martin]'s intentions for the characters are. But they are just filling in the gaps."

The season premiere starts off right where the fifth season ended. Material from an excerpt of The Winds of Winter, published online, regarding a traveling theater troupe located in Braavos that stages a play called "The Bloody Hand", about the events that have taken place in King's Landing since the beginning of the series, is included in the sixth season.

Filming

Filming for the sixth season began in July 2015 and ended on December. The budget for the sixth season increased compared to the previous seasons as each episode cost over $10 million, totaling over $100 million for the full season and setting a new high for the series. The season filmed in five different countries: Northern Ireland, Spain, Croatia, Iceland, and Canada.

Like the previous seasons, a large amount of production took place in Northern Ireland, mainly in Belfast and on the Causeway Coast, including film locations in the Binevenagh, Magilligan area, which was used to film scenes for the Dothraki Grasslands, and Larrybane Quarry and Ballintoy Harbour, both used for scenes in the Iron Islands. For the siege of Riverrun, the small village of Corbet was used. As in previous seasons, some of Castle Black was set at the abandoned Magheramorne quarry. 
 
During September and October, the show also filmed in Spain, specifically in Girona, Navarre, Peniscola, and Almería. Specific locations included the Castle of Zafra in Guadalajara, the Bardenas Reales Natural Park in Navarre, the Alcazaba in Almería, and the Castle of Santa Florentina in Canet de Mar.

In August 2015, HBO announced that for the first time since season 1 the show would not be filming any scenes in Croatia. The Croatian city of Dubrovnik has stood in for King's Landing since the beginning of season 2; nearby cities such as Klis, Split and Šibenik have been used to depict various other locations. Contradicting the statement by HBO, filming took place in Dubrovnik, where the cast of the show were seen in costume in October 2015.

Only a very small portion of the season was filmed in Canada (north of Calgary, Alberta): the scenes featuring Jon Snow's wolf, Ghost (played by animal actor Quigly). However, some of the special effects were created at Montreal's Rodeo FX studios which has won Emmy Awards previously for its work on the series.

Casting

The sixth season saw the return of Isaac Hempstead Wright as Bran Stark, Kristian Nairn as Hodor, Ellie Kendrick as Meera Reed, Gemma Whelan as Yara Greyjoy, and Rory McCann as Sandor "The Hound" Clegane, who did not appear in the fifth season. Clive Russell, Tobias Menzies, Patrick Malahide, Richard Dormer, and Paul Kaye also returned to the show as Brynden Tully, Edmure Tully, Balon Greyjoy, Beric Dondarrion, and Thoros of Myr after not appearing since the third season. Jonathan Pryce as the High Sparrow was added to the series main cast after appearing in a recurring role in the previous season.

Across the Narrow Sea, Melanie Liburd plays a red priestess from Asshai who is in R'hllor's service. At the Reach, House Tarly is introduced, with Freddie Stroma joining the cast as Samwell Tarly's brother Dickon, a character so far only mentioned in the novels. Other members of House Tarly that were introduced were Randyll Tarly, played by James Faulkner; Melessa Tarly, played by Samantha Spiro; and Talla Tarly, portrayed by Rebecca Benson.

Veteran actor Max von Sydow was cast to play the Three-Eyed-Raven, Bran's trainer, previously played by Struan Rodger in the fourth-season finale, "The Children". David Bradley confirmed in August 2015 that he would be returning to the show as Walder Frey after last appearing in the third-season finale, "Mhysa", but he did not confirm when. After the second official trailer was released, it was confirmed that Bradley would appear in the sixth season. Danish actor Pilou Asbæk joins the show as Theon Greyjoy's uncle, pirate captain Euron Greyjoy. Ricky Champ played Gatins, an outlaw in a band using religion to extort the people of the countryside. A young Ned Stark was portrayed by Sebastian Croft in a flashback scene.

The sixth season also included a traveling theater troupe located in Braavos that stages a play called "The Bloody Hand", about the events that have taken place in King's Landing since the beginning of the series. Essie Davis and Kevin Eldon joined the cast in this theater troupe, portraying actors playing Cersei Lannister and Ned Stark, respectively, while Richard E. Grant was cast as the troupe's manager. Members of Icelandic indie band Of Monsters and Men appear as the musicians of the Braavos theatre group.

Music

The soundtrack for the season was digitally released in June 2016, and on CD late the following month. The album reached No. 27 on the Billboard 200, No. 1 on Soundtrack chart and No. 79 on the Canadian Albums chart on its digital release, with the track from the season finale "Light of the Seven" reaching No. 1 on Billboards Spotify Viral 50 chart.

Reception

Critical response

On Metacritic, the season (based on the first episode) has a score of 73 out of 100 based on 9 reviews, indicating "generally favorable reviews". On Rotten Tomatoes, the sixth season has an approval rating of 94% from 37 critics with an average rating of 8.28 out of 10. The site's critical consensus reads, "Bloody and captivating as always, Game of Thrones plunges back into the midst of a world touched by grief, dread, and precarious sexuality."

New York Daily News wrote about the premiere episode, "It's finally back - in all its gory grandeur." New York Post praised the "gloriously brutal moments" in the premiere episode. Mary McNamara of the Los Angeles Times praised some of the humorous moments in the premiere. The Boston Globe called the premiere a "busy hour, leaping from place to place to catch us up with the Game of Thrones gang and set the stage for the sixth season... But fun was afoot." Vulture gave the premiere a score 4 out of 5 and found the episode more "compelling" than season 5, while Observer.com praised the episode for not "overly-rushing".

The Orlando Sentinel eulogized the show for "playing by its own rules", and not "pander for fans' affection and take easy storytelling routes" like other shows. Slate gave the premiere a positive review and stated, "Game of Thrones is finally off book, having lapped George R.R. Martin's slowly gestating A Song of Ice and Fire series. Finally, it seemed, anything could happen." Matt Zoller Seitz of Vulture gave the premiere positive review and stated, "The world the characters inhabit is still a hugely dangerous one, but at no point did I feel as though the writers were showing us beautiful butterflies in preparation of pulling their wings off." Entertainment Weekly gave the premiere a score of 'B' and stated, "Few shows on television look better than this one, but it's coming up on great-drama retirement age. Game of Thrones is getting older. But it's not dead, yet." NPR praised the season for "reaching new heights", and "setting up its endgame in spectacular, meticulous fashion".

Ratings 

The season finale had 8.89 million viewers on its initial airing on HBO, up 10 percent from the previous season's finale, the previous most-watched episode. The average gross viewing figure per episode for the show, which includes streaming, DVR recordings, and repeat showings, reached over 25 million for this season, and it was described as the last consensus show on television. The figure went up by 25 percent compared to the previous year, and viewing figures of the show for this season on its on-demand services HBO Now and HBO Go went up by over 90 percent, new records for HBO. Almost 40 percent of viewers watched this season on HBO digital platforms.  The show also broke records on pay television channels in 2016 in the United Kingdom with an average audience of more than 5 million across all platforms and in Australia with a cumulative average audience of 1.2 million viewers.

 Live +7 ratings were not available, so Live +3 ratings have been used instead.

Accolades

For the 32nd TCA Awards, the series was nominated for Program of the Year and Outstanding Achievement in Drama. For the 68th Primetime Emmy Awards, the series received 23 nominations, the most of any series. It won 12 awards, including Outstanding Drama Series, David Benioff and D. B. Weiss for Outstanding Writing for a Drama Series for "Battle of the Bastards", and Miguel Sapochnik for Outstanding Directing for a Drama Series for "Battle of the Bastards". For the 7th Critics' Choice Television Awards, the series won for Best Drama Series.

Release

The season was simulcast around the world by HBO and its broadcast partners. In some countries, it aired the day after its first release. By the end of 2016, the sixth season of Game of Thrones became the most-pirated TV series of the year.

Marketing
In November 2015, a teaser poster displaying Jon Snow was released on the official Game of Thrones Twitter account. A 41-second teaser trailer was released in early December, featuring Jon Snow from the fifth season episode "Hardhome", many of the previous seasons' highlights, and voice-overs from Max von Sydow as the Three-Eyed Raven and Isaac Hempstead Wright as Bran Stark. The first footage from the season was revealed in a new promotional video released shortly afterward by HBO highlighting its new and returning original shows for the coming year, showcasing scenes involving Daenerys Targaryen, Ramsay Bolton, Cersei Lannister, and Tommen Baratheon. On December 28, 2015, Entertainment Weekly released its "Exclusive First Look" issue, featuring an image of Bran Stark, who had shorter hair and was noticeably older from his last appearance in season four. 

In January 2016, three teaser trailers were released, with each teaser depicting the banners of the houses Targaryen, Lannister, and Stark and which included voice-overs by Iwan Rheon as Ramsay Bolton, Jonathan Pryce as The High Sparrow, and an unknown character speaking in Dothraki. The following month, HBO released 28 exclusive photos from the sixth season, picturing several of the main characters during the season and confirming the fates of Theon, Sansa, and Myrcella, while Jon Snow was notably absent. HBO released a teaser trailer on February 14, 2016, that shows the faces of a number of living as well as deceased characters such as Ned Stark, Robb Stark, Catelyn Stark, Joffrey Baratheon, Tywin Lannister, Stannis Baratheon, Ygritte, and, controversially, Jon Snow in the House of Black and White. Later that month, HBO released 16 character posters of both deceased and living characters and two official posters featuring various characters. 

A behind-the-scenes video of the sixth season was released at the end of February, focusing on camera operators working on the show. The first official trailer for season 6 was released on March 8, 2016. Another behind-the-scenes video was released almost a month later, focusing on the creative process of prosthetics, specifically the White Walkers. The video also contained new footage of White Walkers from the sixth season. On March 24, Entertainment Weekly revealed a series of new issues titled "Dame of Thrones", featuring six of the female lead characters from the series and a focus on the sixth season. Shortly afterward, HBO released new photos from season six and a new promo named "March Madness", with new footage. After the screening of the season premiere, "The Red Woman", HBO released a second official trailer. In July, HBO released a blooper reel online.

After the Thrones

After the Thrones, a live aftershow in which hosts Andy Greenwald and Chris Ryan discussed episodes of the series, aired on the stand-alone streaming service HBO Now on the Monday following each episode of the show's sixth season.

Home media
The season was released on Blu-ray and DVD on November 15, 2016. The set includes extra background, behind-the-scenes material, and deleted scenes.

References

External links
  – official US site
  – official UK site
 Game of Thrones – The Viewers Guide on HBO.com
 Making Game of Thrones on HBO.com
 
 

2016 American television seasons
Season 6